Tohamasab-e Olya (also Romanized as Ţohamāsab-e ‘Olyā) is a village in Asemanabad Rural District, in the Central District of Chardavol County, Ilam Province, Iran. At the 2006 census, its population was 169, in 29 families. The village is populated by Kurds.

References 

Populated places in Chardavol County
Kurdish settlements in Ilam Province